St Benet's Chapel is a redundant Roman Catholic chapel in Chapel Lane, Netherton, Bootle, Merseyside, England.  The chapel and the attached priest's house are recorded in the National Heritage List for England as a designated Grade II* listed building. In the List it is described as "an important example of an early Catholic church and is one of the best preserved examples in the north-west".  It is managed by the Historic Chapels Trust.

History
The chapel and associated presbytery were built in 1793, replacing a cottage and barn that had been used by Benedictine priests.  It was built soon after the Catholic Relief Acts of 1778 and 1791 that allowed Roman Catholics to worship openly.  Despite this, only the presbytery was visible from the road, with the chapel concealed behind it.  The chapel was made redundant in 1975 and is owned by the Historic Chapels Trust. The presbytery was restored in 2004 and is used as a residence for retired priests.  The chapel is undergoing restoration in a way to present it as it would have been before the Second Vatican Council.

Architecture
The presbytery faces the road and the chapel stretches at right angles from its rear.  Both buildings are constructed in brick with stone dressings; the presbytery has a slate roof and the chapel has stone slate roof.  The chapel is in two bays with round-headed sash windows. On its west gable is a bellcote surmounted by a cross.  The entrance is at the west end of the north side and consists of paired doors over which is a blind tympanum.  Internally, some of the fittings have been removed, and those remaining are considered to be important.  At the west end is a gallery with a stick balustrade, and a dog-leg staircase on its north side.  Around the chapel is a panelled dado and a cornice.  The east wall is decorated with paired, fluted Corinthian pilasters carrying an entablature with urns, a frieze with anthemions, and an open pediment.  Curtains hang from the pediment, which are open to display a descending dove, a Gloria and cherubs' heads with wings.  The altar is marbled and dates probably from the 1830s.

The presbytery appears from the road to be a "standard two-bay house".  It has two storeys.  Over all the windows are wedge lintels.  The two windows in the ground floor of the entrance front are sashes with glazing bars; the two windows above them are casements.  Between the windows on the ground floor is a doorway containing a six-panel door with flat pilasters and an open pediment, over which is a fanlight.  Between the windows on the upper floor is a blind window.  On the right (north) side are two windows, one on each floor, and a round-headed stair window at an intermediate level.  On each side of the presbytery is a gable surmounted by a chimney stack.

See also

Grade II* listed buildings in Merseyside
List of chapels preserved by the Historic Chapels Trust

References

Grade II* listed churches in Merseyside
Roman Catholic churches completed in 1793
18th-century Roman Catholic church buildings in the United Kingdom
Churches preserved by the Historic Chapels Trust
Buildings and structures in the Metropolitan Borough of Sefton
1793 establishments in England